In the study of the biological sciences,  biocommunication is any specific type of communication within (intraspecific) or between (interspecific) species of plants, animals, fungi, protozoa and microorganisms. Communication basically means sign-mediated interactions following three levels of (syntactic, pragmatic and semantic) rules. Signs in most cases are chemical molecules (semiochemicals), but also tactile, or as in animals also visual and auditive.  Biocommunication of animals may include vocalizations (as between competing bird species), or pheromone production (as between various species of insects), chemical signals between plants and animals (as in tannin production used by vascular plants to warn away insects), and chemically mediated communication between plants and within plants.

Biocommunication of fungi demonstrates that mycelia communication integrates interspecific sign-mediated interactions between fungal organisms soil bacteria and plant root cells without which plant nutrition could not be organized. Biocommunication of Ciliates identifies the various levels and motifs of communication in these unicellular eukaryotes. Biocommunication of Archaea represents keylevels of sign-mediated interactions in the evolutionarily oldest akaryotes. Biocommunication of Phages demonstrates that the most abundant living agents on this planet coordinate and organize by sign-mediated interactions. Biocommunication is the essential tool to coordinate behavior of various cell types of immune systems.

Biocommunication, biosemiotics and linguistics
Biocommunication theory may be considered to be a branch of biosemiotics. Whereas Biosemiotics studies the production and interpretation of signs and codes, biocommunication theory investigates concrete interactions mediated by signs. Accordingly, syntactic, semantic, and pragmatic aspects of biocommunication processes are distinguished. Biocommunication specific to animals  (animal communication) is considered a branch of zoosemiotics. The semiotic study of molecular genetics, can be considered a study of biocommunication at its most basic level.

Interpretation of abiotic indices

Interpreting stimuli from an organism's environment is an essential part of life for any individual.  Abiotic things that an organism must interpret include climate (weather, temperature, rainfall), geology (rocks, soil type), and geography (location of vegetation communities, exposure to elements, location of food and water sources relative to shelter sites).  Birds, for example, migrate using cues such as the approaching weather or seasonal day length cues. Birds also migrate from areas of low or decreasing resources to areas of high or increasing resources. The two primary resources are usually sought to be food or nesting locations.  Birds that nest in the Northern Hemisphere tend to migrate north in the spring season due to the increase in insect population, budding plants and the abundance of nesting locations.  During the winter time birds will migrate south to not only escape the cold, but find a sustainable food source.  Plants will bloom and attempt to reproduce when they sense days getting shorter. If they can't fertilize before the seasons change and they die then they wouldn't pass on their genes. So their ability to recognize a change in abiotic factors allow them to ensure reproduction.

Trans-organismic communication

Trans-organismic communication is when organisms of different species interact. In biology the relationships formed between different species is known as symbiosis. These relationships come in two main forms mutualistic and parasitic. Mutualistic Relationships are when both species benefit from their interactions. Take Pilot fish for example, they gather around sharks, rays, and sea turtles to eat various parasites off of the larger organism. The fish get food from following the sharks around, and the sharks receive a cleaning for not eating the pilot fish. Parasitic relationships are where one organism benefits off of the other organism at a cost. For example take mistletoe, it may be the focus of an intimate holiday tradition but it is a parasite. In order for mistletoe to grow it must leach water and nutrients from a tree or shrub. Communication between species is not limited to securing sustenance, it can come in many forms. Many flowers rely on bees to spread their pollen and facilitate floral reproduction. So they evolved bright attractive petals and sweet nectar in order to attract the bees. In a recent study done at the university of Buenos Aires, they examined a possible relationship between fluorescence and attraction. However it was concluded that reflected light was much more important in pollinator attraction than fluorescence. Communicating with other species allows organisms to form relationships that are advantageous in survival, and they are all based on some form of trans organismic communication.

Inter organismic communication

Inter organismic communication in communication between organisms of the same species (conspecifics), this includes human speech. Especially in humans, communication is key to upholding social structure. Dolphins likewise communicate with one another in a number of different ways by creating sounds, making physical contact with one another and through the use of body language. Dolphins vocally communicate through clicking sounds and pitches of whistling specific to only one individual. The whistling helps communicate to other dolphins the location of that individual. For example, if a mother loses sight of her offspring, or when two familiar individuals cannot find each other, their individual pitches help navigate back into a group.  Body language can be used to indicate numerous things such as a nearby predator, to indicate to others that food has been found, and to demonstrate their level of attractiveness in order to find a mating partner, and even more. However, mammals such as dolphins and humans are not alone communicating within their own species. Peacocks can fan their feathers in order to communicate a territorial warning. Bees can tell other bees when they’ve found nectar by “dancing” when they return to the hive.  Deer may flick their tails to warn others in their trail that anger may be approaching.

Intra organismic communication

Intra organismic communication is not solely the passage of information within an organism, but concrete interaction between and within cells of an organism mediated by signs. This could be on a cellular and molecular level. An organism's ability to interpret its own biotic information is extremely important. If the organism is injured, falls ill, or must respond to danger, it needs to be able to process that physiological information and adjust its behavior. Take sweating for example, when the human body starts to overheat, specialized glands release sweat which absorb the heat and then evaporates. This communication is imperative to survival in many species including plant life. Plants lack a central nervous system so they rely on a decentralized system of chemical messengers. This allows them to grow in response to factors such as wind, light, plant architecture. Using these chemical messengers, they can react to the environment and assess the best growth pattern.  Essentially plants grow to optimize their metabolic efficiency. Humans also rely on chemical messengers for survival. Epinephrine, also known as adrenaline, is a hormone that is secreted during times of great stress. It binds to receptors on the surface of cells and activates a pathway that alters the structure of glucose. This causes a rapid increase in blood sugar, which is just one of the effects adrenaline has on humans. It also activates the central nervous system increasing heart rate breathing rates, this prepares the muscles for the body's natural fight or flight response.  Organisms rely on many different means of intra organismic communication. Whether it is through neural connections, chemical messengers, or hormones it all evolved to respond to threats, maintain homeostasis and ensure self preservation.

Language  hierarchy

Given the complexity and range of biological organisms and the further complexity within the neural organization of any particular animal organism, there is a variety of biocommunication languages.

A hierarchy of biocommunication languages in animals has been proposed by Subhash Kak: these languages, in order  of increasing generality, are associative, re-organizational, and quantum. The three types of formal languages of the Chomsky hierarchy map into the associative language class, although context free languages as proposed by Chomsky do not exist in real life interactions.

See also

Notes

Biological processes
Plant cognition
Semiotics